Abdul Hadi Bin Yahya (born 6 March 1985 in Klang, Selangor) is a Malaysian professional footballer who plays as a forward. He is well known for his prolific goalscoring ability which he shown continuously in the domestic league.

He previously played for PBDKT T-Team FC during the 2010/11 Malaysian Super League season, Kuala Lumpur FA during the 2009/10 season, and PKNS FC during the 2007/2008. Prior to that, he played with Selangor FA from 2005 to 2007.

Club career
Abdul Hadi started his footballing career with the famous Selangor President's Cup Team before being handed his debut with the first team in 2006. After leaving his boyhood team, he then search for more playing time with Klang Valley outfit PKNS FC and old rivals Kuala Lumpur FA. This move prove to be a successful one as he started to score goals and develop his potential. He then move to the east coast of Malaysia to play for Kuala Terengganu outfit PBDKT T-Team FC for the 2010 Malaysia Super League season.

As for the 2011 season he signed with Terengganu FA and already stamp his name among Malaysia best forward as he help his team lift the 2011 Malaysia F.A Cup and finish runners-up only behind Kelantan FA in the Malaysia Super League also topping the scoring charts with total number of 20 league goals.

He joined Perak FA for the 2013 Malaysia Super League season.

Hadi started the 2018 season with Marcerra Kuantan, but after the club was hit financial problems, and subsequently expelled from the league, he terminated his contract with them in April 2018 and joined MOF F.C. for the remainder of the season.

National team
His superb form with Terengganu in the 2011 season earned him a call-up to the Malaysia squad for friendly against Hong Kong. He made his debut for Malaysia as a substitute, and scored his first international goal after only six minutes brought in, against Hong Kong on 3 June 2011.

International Senior Goals

Honours

Club
Terengganu
 Malaysia FA Cup: 2011

Individual
 Malaysia Super League Top Scorer: 2011

External links
 Biodata at selangorfc.com

References

1985 births
Living people
Malaysian footballers
Malaysia international footballers
Malaysian people of Malay descent
PKNS F.C. players
Kuala Lumpur City F.C. players
Selangor FA players
Terengganu FC players
People from Selangor
Association football forwards